Antonovka is a rural locality (a selo) in Krasnoyarovsky Selsoviet of Mazanovsky District, Amur Oblast, Russia. The population was 35 as of 2018. There is 1 street.

Geography 
Antonovka is located on the left bank of the Birma River, 35 km southwest of Novokiyevsky Uval (the district's administrative centre) by road. Petrovka is the nearest rural locality.

References 

Rural localities in Mazanovsky District